Eustachy is a given name. Notable people with the name include:

Eustachy Erazm Sanguszko (1768–1844), Polish general and politician
Eustachy Sapieha (1881–1963), Polish nobleman, prince, politician, Minister of Foreign Affairs and deputy to the Polish parliament
Eustachy Stanisław Sanguszko (1842–1903), Polish noble (szlachcic), conservative politician
Eustachy Tyszkiewicz (1814–1874), Polish–Lithuanian noble, archaeologist and historian from the former Grand Duchy of Lithuania
Larry Eustachy (born 1955), former NCAA Men's Basketball coach